Manguinhos may refer to the following places in Brazil:

 Manguinhos, Rio de Janeiro, a neighborhood in Rio de Janeiro
 Manguinhos Airport, a former airport in that neighborhood 
 Manguinhos Library Park, a library in Rio de Janeiro
 Manguinhos, Serra, a neighborhood in Serra, Espírito Santo